Gymnopilus arenicola is a species of mushroom-forming fungus in the family Hymenogastraceae. It was described as new to science in 1969 by American mycologist Lexemuel Ray Hesler, from collections made in Washington.

See also

 List of Gymnopilus species

References

arenicola
Fungi described in 1969
Fungi of North America
Taxa named by Lexemuel Ray Hesler